Wade Boteler (October 3, 1888 – May 7, 1943) was an American film actor and writer. He appeared in more than 430 films between 1919 and 1943.

Biography
He was born in Santa Ana, California, and died in Hollywood, California, from a heart attack.

Boteler graduated from the American Academy of Dramatic Arts. After he graduated, he stayed there as a director until he joined the Army in World War I. For three years in the mid-1920s, he worked for Douglas MacLean's film company as both actor and writer.

On Broadway, Boteler appeared in the play The Silent Voice (1914).

Partial filmography

 The False Road (1920)
 Lahoma (1920)
 An Old Fashioned Boy (1920)
 She Couldn't Help It (1920)
 Ducks and Drakes (1921)
 The Home Stretch (1921)
 Fifty Candles (1921)
 One Man in a Million (1921)
 Blind Hearts (1921)
 At the Sign of the Jack O'Lantern (1922)
 Deserted at the Altar (1922)
 Don't Shoot (1922)
 The Lying Truth (1922)
 The Woman's Side (1922)
 Ridin' Wild (1922)
 Around the World in Eighteen Days (1923)
 The Social Buccaneer (1923)
 The Ghost Patrol (1923)
 Going Up (1923)
 A Man of Action (1923)
 Hit and Run (1924)
 Through the Dark (1924)
 Never Say Die (1924)
 Capital Punishment (1925)
 Introduce Me (1925)
 Jimmie's Millions (1925)
 Marriage in Transit (1925)
 Havoc (1925)
 Seven Keys to Baldpate (1925)
 The Last Edition (1925)
 Hold That Lion (1926)
 That's My Baby (1926)
 Let It Rain (1927)
 Soft Cushions (1927)
 The Baby Cyclone (1928)
 Top Sergeant Mulligan (1928)
 The Crash (1928)
 A Woman Against the World (1928)
 Warming Up (1928) (uncredited)
 The Toilers (1928)
 The Flying Fleet (1929)
 The Godless Girl (1929) (uncredited)
 Navy Blues (1929)
 The Leatherneck (1929)
 Dynamite (1929)
 Soldiers and Women (1930)
 The Devil's Holiday (1930)
 Midnight Daddies (1930)
 The Way of All Men (1930)
 24 Hours (1931)
 Possessed (1931) (uncredited)
 The Painted Desert (1931)
 Manhattan Tower (1932)
 The Strange Love of Molly Louvain (1932)
 The Death Kiss (1932)
 Speed Demon (1932)
 Come on Danger! (1932)
 Speed Madness (1932)
 End of the Trail (1932)
 Hello, Sister! (1933)
 Advice to the Lovelorn (1933)
 The Kennel Murder Case (1933) (uncredited)
 Duck Soup (1933) (uncredited)
 Queen Christina (1933) (uncredited)
 Hold Your Man (1933) (uncredited)
 Unknown Valley (1933)
 A Man's Game (1934)
 Among the Missing (1934)
 Black Fury (1935)
 The Headline Woman (1935)
 Society Doctor (1935)
 Cheers of the Crowd 1935)
 Streamline Express (1935)
 The Goose and the Gander (1935)
 The Bride Walks Out (1936)
 The Magnificent Brute (1936)
 Charlie Chan at the Circus (1936)
 Alibi for Murder (1936)
 Shakedown (1936)
 Human Cargo (1936)
 It Can't Last Forever (1937)
 The Frame-Up (1937)
 52nd Street (1937)
 The Marines Are Here (1938)
 Valley of the Giants (1938)
 Youth Takes a Fling (1938)
 The Roaring Twenties (1939) (uncredited)
 The Oklahoma Kid (1939)
 The Green Hornet (1940)
 Ski Patrol (1940)
 Hot Steel (1940)
 Castle on the Hudson (1940)
 Three Faces West (1940)
 The Howards of Virginia (1940)
 Under Texas Skies (1940)
 The Green Hornet Strikes Again! (1941), as Michael Axford, Britt Reid's bodyguard.
 Six Lessons from Madame La Zonga (1941)
 Strange Alibi (1941)
 The Body Disappears (1941)
 Highway West (1941)
 Pacific Blackout (1941)
 Timber (1942)
 The Secret Code (1942)
 I Was Framed (1942)
 Escape from Crime (1942)
 Find the Blackmailer (1943)
 The Last Ride (1944)

References

External links

1888 births
1943 deaths
20th-century American male actors
American male film actors
American male silent film actors
Male actors from Santa Ana, California
United States Army personnel of World War I